HD 22781, is a single star about  away. It is a K-type main-sequence star. The star’s age is poorly constrained at  billion years, but is likely similar to that of the Sun. HD 22781 is heavily depleted in heavy elements, having just 45% of Sun's concentration of iron, yet is comparatively rich in carbon, having 90% of Sun`s abundance.

An imaging survey in 2012 has failed to find any stellar companions, suggesting HD 22781 is a single star.

Planetary system
In 2011 a transiting superjovian planet or brown dwarf b was detected on an extremely eccentric orbit. It is located just outside of the conservative habitable zone of the parent star. Planets around such metal-poor stars are rare; the only three known similar cases are HD 111232 and HD 181720.

In 2012, a radial velocity data review indicated there are no additional giant planets in the system.

References

Perseus (constellation)
K-type main-sequence stars
Planetary systems with one confirmed planet
J03404953+3149345
022781
Durchmusterung objects
017187